Berchmans Institute of Management Studies (BIMS) established in 1995, is under the management of St. Berchmans College affiliated to Mahatma Gandhi University, Kottayam. Berchmans Institute of Management Studies offers a full-time Master of Business Administration programme. Berchmans Institute of Management Studies is recognized by All India Council for Technical Education, New Delhi.

Specializations
Marketing
Finance
Human Resources
Information Systems

Management fest
Berchnova is an All India Management fest organised by the faculty and students of the Berchmans Institute of Management Studies.

Entrepreneur of the year award
Berchmans Institute of Management Studies honours best entrepreneur every year. The entrepreneur award is the highlight of the Berchnova.
Berchmans Institute of Management Studies is the only educational institution in this part of the country which conducts entrepreneur award of the state each year. The best entrepreneur is chosen after conducting survey of one hundred organisations. Screening, personal interviews and a committee consisting of industrial bigwigs and academicians shortlists them to one. Award winner of respective years are listed in the table.

Conferences
National or international conferences are held every year at Berchmans Institute of Management Studies. The conference is intended to provide a platform for corporate executives, researchers and the academia to exchange and share their experiences and research developments.

The first international conference was held in the year 2012. A national conference was held in 2011. 

The Berchmans International Conference (BINC 2022) 2022 was held on 10th and 11th March 2022 on the theme "Re-framing Business Dynamics for the New Era". 

Colleges affiliated to Mahatma Gandhi University, Kerala
Christian universities and colleges in India
Changanassery
Universities and colleges in Kottayam district
1995 establishments in Kerala
Educational institutions established in 1995